John Chambers (born 7 October 1949) is an English former footballer who played in the Football League for Aston Villa and Southend United. He also had a spell as manager of Kidderminster Harriers from 1979 to 1983, and became player-manager of Alvechurch in 1984.

References

English footballers
English Football League players
1949 births
Living people
Aston Villa F.C. players
Southend United F.C. players
Bromsgrove Rovers F.C. players
Kidderminster Harriers F.C. managers
Association football midfielders
Alvechurch F.C. managers
Alvechurch F.C. players
English football managers